The Constitutional Reform of 1848 (Dutch: Grondwetsherziening van 1848) laid the basis for the present system of parliamentary democracy in the Netherlands. It is often described as the original version of the Dutch Constitution that is still in force today. Under pressure from the Revolutions of 1848 in surrounding countries, King William II agreed to several demands of the liberal parliamentary opposition. The House of Representatives obtained much more influence, and was now directly elected (although still by a restricted group of voters within a system of single-winner electoral districts). The reform was in some sense a peaceful revolution, in which liberal politician Johan Rudolph Thorbecke and King William II played important roles.

On 17 March 1848, the king appointed a state commission composed by Johan Rudolph Thorbecke (leader), Dirk Donker Curtius, Jacobus Mattheüs de Kempenaer, Lodewijk Caspar Luzac and Lambertus Dominicus Storm to prepare the Constitutional Reform, which was finished on 19 June. The commission's draft formed the basis of the government's proposals. The King and Minister Donker Curtius then made sure that the proposals were accepted by both houses of the States General, both of which still had a conservative majority. Agreement was reached on 11 October 1848. On 3 November 1848, the new Constitution was proclaimed.

The most important changes included:
The introduction of full ministerial responsibility, which meant the henceforth the Ministers were responsible for the government's policies instead of the king, who received sovereign immunity. 
The States-Provincial, themselves elected by the voter, appointed by majorities for each province the members of the Senate from a select group of upper class citizens.
Parliament was henceforth elected directly by men who met the tax-based property qualifications, and obtained the right to interpellation, the right to hold investigative hearings (recht van enquête), and the right to amend government bills.
Political and civil rights were expanded with the addition of the freedom of assembly and freedom of association, the privacy of correspondence, freedom of ecclesiastical organisation and the freedom of education.

The freedom of ecclesiastical organisation enabled the Catholic Church to reestablish the episcopal hierarchy in the Netherlands in 1853 (the previous hierarchy had been abolished during the Eighty Years' War). This challenged the perceived notion of the Netherlands being a Protestant nation, but Prime Minister Thorbecke maintained that, based on the freedom of religion and separation of church and state, the Catholic Church was allowed to reorganise itself on Dutch territory. Conservative Protestants initiated the April Movement in an attempt to prevent it, winning the sympathy of King William III. This led to a constitutional crisis and the resignation of the Thorbecke cabinet, because the king had violated the new Constitution that prohibited his interference in political affairs, and the ministers had to take responsibility in his stead.

References 

Constitutional amendments
Dutch political institutions
Government of the Netherlands
Legal history of the Netherlands
Political history of the Netherlands
Reform in the Netherlands
1848 documents
1848 in the Netherlands